General Duong Sam Ol is the former Minister for National Defense of Cambodia. He was a Politburo member of the NUFK Central Committee.

References

Year of birth missing (living people)
Cambodian politicians
Possibly living people
Cambodian military personnel
Defence ministers of Cambodia